Naomi Isozaki (礒崎 直美, Isozaki Naomi) is a Japanese Paralympic archer.

Isozaki competed at the Paralympic Games in 2000, where she won a bronze medal in the women's teams open event alongside Hifumi Suzuki and Masako Yonezawa,
and in 2004, where she won a silver medal in the individual W1/W2 event.

References

Year of birth missing (living people)
Living people
Japanese female archers
Paralympic archers of Japan
Paralympic silver medalists for Japan
Paralympic bronze medalists for Japan
Archers at the 2000 Summer Paralympics
Archers at the 2004 Summer Paralympics
Medalists at the 2000 Summer Paralympics
Medalists at the 2004 Summer Paralympics
Paralympic medalists in archery
21st-century Japanese women